Vrhovo pri Mirni Peči is a small settlement in the Municipality of Mirna Peč in southeastern Slovenia. The municipality is included in the Southeast Slovenia Statistical Region. The entire area is part of the historical region of Lower Carniola.

References

External links
Vrhovo pri Mirni Peči on Geopedia

Populated places in the Municipality of Mirna Peč